Keep Northern Ireland Beautiful (KNIB), known until 2014 as TIDY Northern Ireland, is a non-profit environmental organisation based in Northern Ireland. In addition to running the "Keep Northern Ireland Tidy" campaign, it supports or provides grants for local environmental programmes such as the 'Beautiful Beach Awards', litter surveys, a 'Marine Litter Report', local gardening projects, an Eco-Schools program, Green Coast Awards, TIDY Business and Borough Cleanliness Survey. The organisation is registered as a charity with the Charity Commission for Northern Ireland and, as of 2022, had 13 employees.

KNIB produces information on the cleanliness of Northern Ireland that is used to direct resources to environmental quality issues. It has conducted public information campaigns on litter, including on youth litter. It has also campaigned on issues such as fly-tipping, dog fouling and neighbourhood noise.

Much of the organisation's work overlaps with the Clean Neighbourhoods and Environment (NI) Act 2011, The Litter (NI) Order 1994 and The Waste and Contaminated Land (NI) Order 1997.

See also
Keep America Beautiful
Keep Britain Tidy
Keep New Zealand Beautiful
Keep Scotland Beautiful
Keep Wales Tidy

References

External links
 

Environment of Northern Ireland
Charities based in Northern Ireland
Litter